The Football West State League Division 1  is a regional Australian semi-professional association football league comprising teams from Western Australia. The league sits at Level 2 on the Western Australian league system (Level 3 of the overall Australian league system). The competition is administered by Football West, the governing body of the sport in the state. The league has been called the All Flags State League Division 1 due to sponsorship arrangements since 2011.

Format
The league operates with a promotion and relegation system. Promotion for the Champion of the Division to the National Premier Leagues Western Australia (NPL WA) was introduced for the 2015 season, and is subject to eligibility criteria. Mandurah City were the 2015 champions but did not meet all of the Football West eligibility criteria to be promoted to the 2016 National Premier Leagues WA. Mandurah City and Joondalup United were promoted after the 2016 season to the National Premier Leagues Western Australia (NPL WA) to make it a 14 team division, Mandurah City were relegated in 2017 after being defeated by Forrestfield United in a promotion/relegation play off.

After review by Football West the 2019 NPLWA season was decided to return to a 12 team competition; as a result, Subiaco AFC, Forrestfield United and Joondalup United were relegated and Rockingham City were promoted.

The team that finishes bottom of the table is relegated to the Football West State League Division 2, with the 2nd bottom team competing in a promotion/relegation playoff series with the teams that finished 2nd, 3rd and 4th in the Football West State League Division 2.

In 2020, promotion and relegation was suspended for the season, due to the impacts on the competition from the COVID-19 pandemic in Australia.

Clubs
The following 12 clubs competed in the 2023 WA State League Division 1 season.

References

External links
Football West Official website
Western Australian Football Website

2

it:Football West State League